The Ultimate Collection (stylized as the ultimate collection) is the first compilation album by Japanese singer-songwriter Chihiro Onitsuka, released in 2004. It came out months after the artist terminated the contracts with record label and management office.

All the 15 tracks on the album was digitally remastered by Ted Jensen. Selection of the songs was supervised by Takefumi Haketa, Onitsuka's previous musical collaborator who produced all her materials released under EMI. The performer has not authorized this retrospective album, however, omitting the release from the discography page on her present official website which launched in 2007.

The Ultimate Collection debuted at the number-three on the Japanese Oricon chart and remained there for 23 weeks. The album was certified Platinum by the Recording Industry Association of Japan upon its release, for shipments of over 250,000 copies.

The front cover of the compilation was picked out from the photo session which was taken for her cancelled fourth studio album supposed to have been released in March 2004. Along with the album, a DVD collection composed of 17 music videos entitled The Complete Clips was issued simultaneously.

Track listing

Certifications

Charts

Weekly charts

Album

DVD

Year-end charts
Album

Release history
Album

References

Chihiro Onitsuka albums
2004 compilation albums